Waterford Lakes is an unincorporated suburban development area located in Orange County, Florida, United States and is a part of the Orlando Metro Area.

References

External links
Waterford Lakes Community Association

Unincorporated communities in Orange County, Florida
Planned communities in Florida
Unincorporated communities in Florida